Safe Passage is a 1994 American drama film starring Susan Sarandon, and featuring Sam Shepard, Robert Sean Leonard, Marcia Gay Harden, Nick Stahl, Sean Astin, and Jason London. Directed by Robert Allan Ackerman and written by Deena Goldstone, it is based on the 1988 novel Safe Passage by Ellyn Bache.

The film centers on a large family that reconvenes when one of the adult sons, a Marine deployed in Lebanon for the Gulf War, is possibly among the victims of an explosion at his base. As the family waits out the news, they reopen old wounds, grudges, and unresolved issues.

Plot
Margaret "Mag" Singer, a wife and mother of seven sons, is on the verge of divorcing her husband Patrick and moving to the city for a life of her own. All of the Singers' sons—except for Simon, the youngest—are grown and live on their own. Suddenly, Mag hears news of a terrorist bombing at a Marine base in the Middle East, where Percival, one of her sons, is stationed. Upon learning the news, the remaining five sons gather at the Singer home, anxiously awaiting updates on Percival. The sons include Alfred, the eldest Singer, who is engaged to Cynthia; Gideon, who feels responsible for Percival's decision to enlist and thus blames himself for Percival's possible death; identical twins Darren and Merle; and Izzy, the second-youngest who followed his father into science.

The film's plot shifts between the Singer family resolving old hurts and wounds and flashbacks to Mag raising her sons. At the end, the family is gathered around the TV nervously waiting for word on Percival. Percival is revealed to be safe, and the family rejoices at the good news and their renewed bonds.

Cast
Susan Sarandon as Margaret "Mag" Singer
Sam Shepard as Patrick Singer
Marcia Gay Harden as Cynthia
Robert Sean Leonard as Alfred Singer
Sean Astin as Izzy Singer
Nick Stahl as Simon Singer
Matt Keeslar as Percival Singer
Jesse Lee Soffer as young Percival 
Steven Robert Ross as Darren Singer
Philip Arthur Ross as Merle Singer
Benjamin Preston as Cynthia's Son
Jordan Clarke as Coach
Jeffrey DeMunn as Doctor
Philip Bosco as Mort
Jason London as Gideon Singer
Rutanya Alda as Beth
Joe Lisi as Dog Owner
Marvin Scott as Newsperson #1
Bill Boggs as Newsperson #2
Christopher Wynkoop as Evangelist

Production
Safe Passage was shot in Glen Ridge, New Jersey. It began shooting on January 26, 1994, and completed on March 22 of that year. The film was held up for release by a court injunction brought by Dan Lupowitz, who claimed he brought both the director and Susan Sarandon into the project and wanted an "executive producer" credit. The claim was later dismissed in court.

Reception 
The film received mixed reviews, with a Rotten Tomatoes score of 54% based on 13 reviews. In a two-star review, Roger Ebert praised the cast and Sarandon’s performance, but said the family drama felt contrived and formulaic. Lisa Schwarzbaum of Entertainment Weekly gave the film a grade of B−, commending the acting but saying Goldstone’s screenplay “has all of the heft of a special, two-hour episode of Party of Five — a TV-shaped domestic drama overloaded with the kinds of emotions you see only on TV and never in your own family.”

Year-end lists 
 4th – Mack Bates, The Milwaukee Journal
 Honorable mention –  Glenn Lovell, San Jose Mercury News

References

External links
 
 
 
 

1994 films
1994 drama films
1990s English-language films
American drama films
Films about brothers
Films about families
Films based on American novels
Films directed by Robert Allan Ackerman
Films produced by Gale Anne Hurd
Films scored by Mark Isham
Films shot in New Jersey
Films about mother–son relationships
New Line Cinema films
1990s American films